Frederick Samuel (Fred) Zaplitny (June 9, 1913 – March 19, 1964) was a Canadian politician. He represented the electoral district of Dauphin in the House of Commons of Canada from 1945 to 1949, and from 1953 to 1958. He was a member of the Cooperative Commonwealth Federation.

Zaplitny also sought election to the Legislative Assembly of Manitoba in the provincial elections of 1936, 1941 and 1949, but was never successful in being elected to the provincial legislature. Zaplitny was of Ukrainian descent.

References

 

1913 births
1964 deaths
Members of the House of Commons of Canada from Manitoba
Co-operative Commonwealth Federation MPs
Canadian people of Ukrainian descent
Canadian socialists
Canadian socialists of Ukrainian descent
20th-century Canadian politicians